The 1989 Brownlow Medal was the 62nd year the award was presented to the player adjudged the fairest and best player during the Victorian Football League (VFL) home and away season. Paul Couch of the Geelong Football Club won the medal by polling twenty-two votes during the 1989 VFL season.

Leading votegetters 

* The player was ineligible to win the medal due to suspension by the VFL Tribunal during the year.

References 

Brownlow Medal
1989